In computer networking, the Network Access Identifier (NAI) is a standard way of identifying users who request access to a network. The standard syntax is "user@realm".  Sample NAIs include (from RFC 4282):

 bob
 joe@example.com
 fred@foo-9.example.com
 fred.smith@example.com
 fred_smith@example.com
 fred$@example.com
 fred=?#$&*+-/^smith@example.com
 eng.example.net!nancy@example.net
 eng%nancy@example.net
 @privatecorp.example.net
 \(user\)@example.net
 alice@xn--tmonesimerkki-bfbb.example.net

Network Access Identifiers were originally defined in RFC 2486, which was superseded by  RFC 4282, which has been superseded by RFC 7542. The latter RFC is the current standard for the NAI.  NAIs are commonly found as user identifiers in the RADIUS and Diameter network access protocols and the EAP authentication protocol.

See also
 Diameter
 EAP
 RADIUS
 Request for Comments

The Network Access Identifier (NAI) is the user identity submitted by the client during network access authentication.

It is used mainly for two purposes:
 The NAI is used when roaming, to identify the user.
 To assist in the routing of the authentication request to the user's authentication server.

External links
RFC 7542
RFC 4282

Internet Standards